Vera Vladimirovna Afanasyeva is a professor at the Saratov State University and author, PhD in Philosophy, Member of the Petrovskaya Academy of Sciences and Arts.

Vera Afanasyeva was born and lives in Saratov.
She graduated from the Saratov State University in 1984, and earned her Candidat degree in 1991.
In 2002, she defended her doctoral thesis.

Afanasyeva is the author of 10 monographs and about 200 scientific articles.

She has two daughters.

References

External links

Vera Afanasyev at Saratov State University 

Russian women scientists
Saratov State University alumni
Academic staff of Saratov State University

Year of birth missing (living people)
Living people